Dichomeris metuens is a moth in the family Gelechiidae. It was described by Edward Meyrick in 1932. It is found on Java in Indonesia.

References

Moths described in 1932
metuens